The NWA Central States Tag Team Championship was the primary tag team championship for the Heart of America Sports Attractions / Central States Wrestling promotion from 1979 until the promotion ceased to exist in 1988. The Central States Tag Team Championship had originally existed for a brief period of time in 1961, but its glory days date from 1979 to 1988, where it replaced the Central States version of the NWA World Tag Team Championship. Because the championship is a professional wrestling championship, it is not won or lost competitively but instead by the decision of the bookers of a wrestling promotion. The championship is awarded after the chosen team "wins" a match to maintain the illusion that professional wrestling is a competitive sport.

A total of 80 wrestler have combined in 55 different teams have held the NWA Central States Tag Team Championship for a total of 68 reigns. Central States booker "Bulldog" Bob Brown has held the championship the most times, nine times with seven different partners. The Batten Twins (Brad and Bart Batten) is the team to have held the championship the most times as a team with four title reigns to their credit. Bob Brown's combined 528 days is the longest combined reigns of any one person and the Batten Twins 292 days is the longest for any team. The longest individual reign was the team of "Bulldog" Bob Brown and Marty Jannetty who held it for 249 days. Due to gaps in documentation it cannot be verified if the three-day reign of Bob Brown and Pat O'Connor is the shortest reign of any champions.

Title history

Team reigns by combined length
Key

Individual reigns by combined length
Key

See also
National Wrestling Alliance
Central States Wrestling
NWA World Tag Team Championship (Central States version)

Footnotes

References
General references

Specific references

Heart of America Sports Attractions championships
National Wrestling Alliance championships
Tag team wrestling championships
Regional professional wrestling championships